Fabrício Santos de Jesus (born 13 June 1992), known as Fabrício Baiano, is a Brazilian professional footballer who plays as a defensive midfielder for Brazilian club Avaí, on loan from Fortaleza.

Birth adulteration 
In March 2012, Baiano confessed that he had misrepresented his real age. At that moment, Fabrício dos Santos de Jesus, born 13 June 1992, was commonly known as Heitor Bispo dos Santos, born 7 March 1996. Baiano had adultered his age in March 2007 to gain more chances in football, joining Vasco da Gama as a youth player a year later.

References

External links 

1992 births
Living people
Sportspeople from Bahia
Brazilian footballers
Association football midfielders
Campeonato Brasileiro Série A players
Campeonato Brasileiro Série B players
Campeonato Brasileiro Série C players
CR Vasco da Gama players
Esporte Clube Novo Hamburgo players
Coritiba Foot Ball Club players
Macaé Esporte Futebol Clube players
Fortaleza Esporte Clube players
Avaí FC players
C.S. Marítimo players
Primeira Liga players
Gençlerbirliği S.K. footballers
Çaykur Rizespor footballers
TFF First League players
Brazilian expatriate footballers
Expatriate footballers in Portugal
Brazilian expatriate sportspeople in Portugal